The Suspect is a 1916 American silent drama film directed by S. Rankin Drew, starring Anita Stewart and produced by the Vitagraph Studios. The film marked Frank Morgan’s film debut.

Cast

Preservation
With no prints of The Suspect located in any film archives, it is a lost film.

References

External links

1916 films
American silent feature films
Lost American films
Films directed by S. Rankin Drew
1916 romantic drama films
American romantic drama films
American black-and-white films
Vitagraph Studios films
1910s American films
Silent romantic drama films
Silent American drama films